Hogg is a lunar impact crater on the Moon's far side. It lies less than a crater diameter to the south-southwest of the somewhat larger Kidinnu. This is an old, worn feature with an outer rim that has been eroded to the point where it just forms a rounded crest about the interior. Small craterlets lie along the southern and western rim. The interior has some slight clefts in the surface and a low, crater-like depression in the southern half.

Satellite craters
By convention these features are identified on lunar maps by placing the letter on the side of the crater midpoint that is closest to Hogg.

References

 
 
 
 
 
 
 
 
 
 
 
 

Impact craters on the Moon